Guepiniopsis is a genus of fungi in the family Dacrymycetaceae. The genus contains about seven widely distributed species. Guepiniopsis was circumscribed by Narcisse Théophile Patouillard in 1883.

References

Dacrymycetes
Taxa named by Narcisse Théophile Patouillard
Taxa described in 1883